Count, later Prince, Alexander Otto Hugo Wladimir zu Münster (1 September 1858 – 12 October 1922) was a German aristocrat who was the owner of Maresfield Park estate, Maresfield, East Sussex.

Early life and family
Alexander Münster was born in Derneburg, Hanover, on 1 September 1858, the son of Prince Georg Herbert Münster (1820–1902), German ambassador in London 1873-1885 and subsequently Paris. His mother was his father's first wife, Princess Aleksandra Mikhailovna Golitsyna.

In 1890 he married Lady Muriel Hay (1863–1927), daughter of George Hay-Drummond, 12th Earl of Kinnoull, at St Andrews church in Wells Street, London, an event depicted on the front page of The Illustrated London News. The couple had sons Friedrich (1891) and Paul (1898).

Life in England
Münster inherited Maresfield Park estate in 1899 from his friend Hervey Charles Pechell.  Münster was in fact living in Maresfield Park while Pechell and his wife, Blanche Henrietta Johnes Shelley, resided in Bellagio in Italy. He officiated at the planting of the oak on Maresfield Recreation Ground commemorating Queen Victoria's Jubilee in 1897 which was performed by her eldest daughter the Empress Frederick of Germany. The Pechells had donated the ground to the parish in 1897 but Münster legally transferred it in 1899. In 1915, during the First World War, it was seized from him by the British government under the Trading With the Enemy laws as he was a German citizen. Records relating to Maresfield Park are held by the East Sussex Record Office.

Death and legacy
Münster died on 12 October 1922. Maresfield Park was sold in 1924 to William Henry Abbey, a brewer , industrialist and landowner.

References

External links 

The Heirs of Europe: MÜNSTER.

1858 births
1922 deaths
Nobility from Hanover
German emigrants to the United Kingdom
People from Maresfield